The Aristonectidae is a taxonomic family of poorly known plesiosaurs from the Jurassic and Cretaceous periods. They are closely related to polycotylid plesiosaurs. The family is made up of Tatenectes, Kimmerosaurus, Aristonectes, and Kaiwhekea. This group was formerly known as the Cimoliasauridae, but since Cimoliasaurus is indeterminate and quite possibly elasmosaurid, this replacement name was erected.

Tatenectes and Kimmerosaurus represent an earlier Oxfordian Jurassic radiation from Laurasia, while Aristonectes and Kaiwhekea represent a later Cretaceous radiation from Gondwana.

Appearance 
Aristonectidae were characterized by a relatively larger head and shorter neck than the Plesiosauridae and Elasmosauridae. Teeth resemble those of the Plesiosauridae. The group is known only from scanty and fragmentary remains.

The formal diagnosis of the clade is that they possess:
 A snout that is relatively long but unconstricted and wide anteriorly
 A paroccipital process of the opisthotic that articulates only with the squamosal
 Teeth that are small and relatively narrow (crown length < 1 cm)
 Number of premaxillary teeth is 7 or more
 Number of maxillary teeth is greater than 30
 Palate with a ventrally expanded boss projecting out of the plane of the palate between the posterior and anterior interpterygoid vacuity
 Number of cervical vertebrae greater than 32
 Cervical vertebrae much wider than long
 Cervical vertebrae with poorly defined rims of articular surfaces
 Marked dorso-ventral constriction of cervical centra on ventral midline (binocular-shaped)
 Neural arch and canal very small relative to centrum diameter

References 
 O'Keefe, F. R. and Street, H. P. 2009. Osteology of the Cryptocleidoid Plesiosaur Tatenectes laramiensis, with Comments on the Taxonomic Status of the Cimoliasauridae. Journal of Vertebrate Paleontology, 29(1): 48–57. BioOne Online Journals

Jurassic plesiosaurs
Cretaceous plesiosaurs
Oxfordian first appearances
Late Cretaceous extinctions